Wim Bolten (23 April 1901 – 19 December 1971) was a Dutch sprinter. He competed in the men's 400 metres at the 1924 Summer Olympics. He was the brother of swimmer Ada Bolten.

References

External links
 

1901 births
1971 deaths
Athletes (track and field) at the 1924 Summer Olympics
Dutch male sprinters
Dutch male middle-distance runners
Olympic athletes of the Netherlands
Athletes from Amsterdam
20th-century Dutch people